Major-General Htein Win is a Burmese military officer and current commander of Myanmar's Southern Command, which encompasses Bago and Magway Regions. Magway Region, as part of the Bamar heartland, has been a major centre of the civilian resistance in the 2021–2023 Myanmar civil war, since the 2021 Myanmar coup d'etat. Htein Win has overseen the military's 'kill all, burn all, loot all' strategy in Magway Region. He has been sanctioned by the European Union, Switzerland, and Canada for violating human rights and committing crimes against civilians in the Southern Command.

In April 2007, he was a brigadier general overseeing Taikkyi station.

See also 
 2021–2023 Myanmar civil war
 State Administration Council
 Tatmadaw

References 

Living people
Burmese generals
Year of birth missing (living people)